Podolínec is a town in the Stará Ľubovňa District of the Prešov Region in northern Slovakia.

Etymology
The etymology is straightforward, the name means in Slovak "place between the hills".

History
The first written record of Podolínec, as part of Polish-ruled Ziema Sądecka land, dates from 1236 and is included in the Kraków Bishop complaint to the Pope regarding the Hungarian clergy, illegally collecting taxes from the local church, which belonged to the Diocese of Kraków. In 1244 Bolesław V the Chaste, the Dux of Sandomierz-Kraków land granted a location permit to a knight from Kraków, called Henryk. In 1292 the place was given the city rights for welcoming German settlers from Silesia, from which on the town was called Pudlein. Pudlein was the first of the Zips towns obtaining the Staple right. Around 1400, Pudlein's shoemakers founded the region's first guild order.
Later in the second half of the 14th century, the town passed in the reign of Hungary. In April 1412, King Sigismund of Luxembourg promoted Podolínec to the status of a free royal town, but later that year it was granted back to Poland as a result of the Treaty of Lubowla and it remained Polish until 1772. There was a Piarists' Collegium, founded by the Starosta (lat. Capitaneus) of Spisz, Stanisław Lubomirski. The most famous ward of the Collegium was Stanisław Konarski who joined the Piarist Order in 1715. Podolínec was at that time a walled town with its own castle. It was the only town in the Spiš region to resist the Hussite raids. Following the First Partition of Poland in 1772, the grant was cancelled in 1773 and the town was re-incorporated into the Kingdom of Hungary three years later. It was part of the "Province of 16 Spiš towns" in the 18th and 19th centuries, but its privileges were gradually reduced and in the end it was incorporated into Szepes county. The industrial revolution bypassed Podolínec and the railway came to the town only in 1893, when some small industrial production developed. In 1918 Podolínec was occupied by Czechoslovak troops and the town became part of Czechoslovakia.

Geography
The town lies near the Poprad River, in the Spiš region, near the Spišská Magura range.

Demographics
According to the 2001 census, the town had 3,173 inhabitants. 94.71% of inhabitants were Slovaks, 4.00% Roma and 0.25% Czechs. The religious makeup was 90.89% Roman Catholics, 2.84% Greek Catholics, 2.24% Lutherans and 2.14% people with no religious affiliation.

Partner towns
 Rytro, Poland

References

External links
Official website

Cities and towns in Slovakia